Orsa Spelmän is a folk music (Spelman) sextet from Orsa in Sweden.

In 1987, the former ABBA member Benny Andersson and Orsa Spelmän began a musical partnership with the recording of the album Klinga mina klockor.  In 2001 the group became part of Benny Anderssons orkester (BAO).  .

In 2006, member Kalle Moraeus was awarded Povel Ramels Karamelodiktstipendium.

Orsa Spelmän have so far released four albums, Orsa Spelmän (1988), Fiolin Min (1990), Ödra (1998) and Orsa nästa (2006), and appear on several records together with Benny Anderssons Orkester.

Discography

Singles

References

External links 
http://www.orsaspelman.com/ 
Orsa Spelmän: The Jewel in the Music Crown from Orsa Kommun official site

Musical groups established in 1987
Swedish folk music groups
Melodifestivalen contestants of 2018
Melodifestivalen contestants of 2010